The Samsung SCH-S380C (Or just S380C) is a mobile phone released in October 2012 by Samsung and shipped by TracFone. It has the ability to play music, watch videos, and apps that are available for purchase. It has a 1.3x megapixel camera, with 1000 mAh of battery capacity. Music can be played and stored on the phone by installing a driver you can find on the Samsung website.

Go here for phone tutorial
http://tracfone.devicebits.com/tracfone/home.seam?custId=TFSAS380C&locale=en_US&popup=true

Samsung mobile phones
Samsung products